Paris Nanterre University (French: Université Paris Nanterre), formerly Paris-X and commonly referred to as Nanterre, is a public research university based in Nanterre, Paris, France. It is one of the most prestigious French universities, mainly in the areas of law, humanities, political science, social and natural sciences and economics. It is one of the thirteen successor universities of the University of Paris. The university is located in the western suburb of Nanterre, in La Défense area, the business district of Paris.

History 

Nanterre was built in the 1960s on the outskirts of Paris as an extension of the Sorbonne. It was set up as an independent university in December 1970. Based on the American model, it was created as a campus (as opposed to the old French universities which were smaller and integrated with the city in which they were located).

Nanterre became famous shortly after its opening by being at the center of the May '68 student rebellion. The campus was nicknamed "Nanterre, la folle" (Mad Nanterre) or "Nanterre la rouge" (Red Nanterre, in reference to communism).

Size and scope 
Nanterre is the second largest campus in France after Nantes, with its own Olympic-sized swimming pool and a stadium. It welcomes 35,000 to 40,000 students every year in all fields of studies: Social Sciences, Philosophy, Literature, History, Languages and Linguistics, Economics, Law and Political Sciences, as well as Teacher Training, Acting, Cinema, Physiology and Sports.

The university is renowned in the fields of Law and Economics. Even though French universities are required by law to admit anyone with a Baccalauréat, strain is put on the students from the start and the first year drop-out rate consistently hovers in the 60% region. At the postgraduate level, the university offers very competitive programs (highly selective master's degrees in Law and Business) and partnerships with some grandes écoles such as the Ecole Polytechnique, ESSEC, Ecole des Mines de Paris, and ESCP Europe among others.

The Rene Ginouves Institute for Archaeology and Anthropology (Maison de l'archeologie et de l'ethnologie Rene Ginouves) is another important institution on campus, merging the departments of the CNRS, Paris I-Panthéon Sorbonne and Paris X-Nanterre.

As in most Parisian universities, there is a large minority of foreign exchange students.

Innovative programs 
Over the years, Nanterre has developed innovative programs such as the double bilingual courses in French Law and Anglo-American, Spanish, Russian, German or Italian law; in Economics & Management (with half of the courses in French and half of the courses in another foreign language); and in History (with half of the courses in French and half of the courses in another foreign language). These programs have inspired many universities and grandes écoles throughout the country and are now renowned on a national level.

Nanterre Network
The Franco-German Summer and Winter Universities with higher education institutions of third countries (Nanterre Network) are an expression of the increasing internationalization of studies and research (Erasmus program; Bologna process, EU enlargement). In legal sciences, the management of the Franco-German studies at the University of Paris Nanterre plays a pioneering role in the establishment of Summer and Winter Universities. Thus, within the framework of its Europe-wide network for university cooperation (Nanterre network), in collaboration with German and other foreign partners, Summer and Winter universities have been emerging since 2004 in Central and Eastern Europe, in the Balkans and in the Mediterranean region − with financial support from the German-French University (DFH/UFA), the Franco-German Youth Service and the French Ministry of Higher Education and Research (Parceco-Program). Since 2013, these tri-national Summer and Winter Universities have also extended to non-European countries.

Objectives, function and functional principles of the Summer and Winter Universities
In September 2012, Bernard Cazeneuve, France's Deputy Minister for European Affairs and patron of the 2nd Franco-German Summer University for Energy and Environmental Law at the University of Paris Nanterre, saw in this type of Summer University a “successful” approach to bridge the lecture-free period; approach which can even be “exported” and is therefore “conducive to the prestige of Franco-German cooperation in Europe”.

Lithuania
The oldest trinational Summer University in Vilnius, Lithuania, focuses on EU legal harmonization. It was founded in 2004 by the University of Paris Nanterre, the Johann Wolfgang Goethe-University in Frankfort on the Main and the University of Vilnius in the year of EU enlargement to countries particularly in Central and Eastern Europe. With their accession, the Baltic States were obliged to take over the entire law of the EU (acquis communautaire) and to implement the goals of the political Union as well as those of the economic and monetary Union. In the first few years, this Summer University was the joint end-of-year event for two binational law schools: the German-Lithuanian Law School (Goethe University of Frankfurt) and the Franco-Lithuanian Law School (Paris Nanterre).

Belarus
The Summer University in Minsk, founded in 2011 by the universities of Paris Nanterre, Potsdam and the Belarusian State University, is devoted to topics of general European relevance, such as “alternative dispute resolution”, “new information and communication technologies”, environmental issues and other current issues. As in the EU, in the post-Soviet Community of Independent States (CIS) the tendency towards regional integration goes hand in hand with the attempt to harmonize national legal systems. Belarus is part of the Russian-Belarusian Union and a member of the (2014 contractually agreed) Eurasian Economic Union.

Balkan countries
The Franco-German Summer University founded in 2014 by the University of Paris Nanterre and the Westphalian Wilhelms-University of Münster with the Balkan region has (for the first time in the history of these Summer Universities) an itinerant character. It takes place through several sessions with changing locations: starting in 2014 at the University of St. Cyril and Methodius Skopje (North Macedonia), the University of Pristina (Kosovo) and the European University of Tirana (UET: Albania). Since then, the scientific and intercultural dialogue between universities from EU countries (Germany, France, Greece) and from countries in the Balkans has intensified and expanded to other destinations in the region, through the progressive inclusion of new partner universities (previously Montenegro, Serbia, Bulgaria). Based on the self-image of both –  of Western Balkan states candidate to EU accession, as well as that of the EU member states - the prospects of development of North Macedonia, Kosovo, Albania, Montenegro and other Western Balkan countries are discussed. The itinerant Summer University should determine to what extent the candidates already meet or will be able to meet the Copenhagen criteria for accession to the EU in the various legal areas concerned (private law, public law, private international law, international criminal law).

Turkey
Founded in January 2016 by the University of Paris Nanterre, the Friedrich Alexander University of Erlangen-Nuremberg and the University of Yeditepe Istanbul, this first German-French-Turkish Winter University in Istanbul is devoted to the theory and practice of private law enforcement. Against the background of the hesitant negotiations between the EU and the permanent candidate Turkey (which so far has at best been granted a “privileged partnership”) since 2005, this issue is of great relevance for European Union law and the law of its member states, and for Turkish law (especially for consumer law, contract law, competition law, security regulations, constitutional law, labor law, arbitration or mediation). As a result of the tense domestic political situation in Turkey, the Winter University has not yet continued. After the failed coup against the Turkish president in July 2016, the state wave of cleansing did not omit the universities. The professors affected also included colleagues who were responsible for the cooperation with the French and German partner universities.

Maghreb states
In April 2013, Paris Nanterre, Potsdam et El Manar University founded in Tunis a Franco-German-Maghrebinian Summer University on the subject of "State policy in a comparative perspective". In the context of the Arab Spring, it takes into account the needs of the countries concerned in political, economic and geostrategic terms. It applies above all to the legal aspects of public policies to promote social and economic development, as well as the democratization of the state. In May 2014, at the 2nd (and provisionally last) Summer University at the Hassan II Mohameddia University in Casablanca/Morocco, the focus was on "Law versus Religion - Intersections and Possible Conflicts of Religious Norms for State Law and International Law". For the 3rd Summer University in June 2015 at the Ecole de Gouvernance et d’Economie (EGE) at the University of Mohammed VI-Polytechnique in Rabat/Morocco, the topic "Citizenship/Citoyenneté" was envisioned.

South America
In September 2013, Paris Nanterre, the Technical University of Dresden and the Pontifical Catholic University of Peru established in Lima the first Franco-German-Peruvian Summer University on the subject of "Democracy and the rule of law".

Given the reform policies in Peru since 2011, human rights issues and strategies to promote the rule of law, the welfare state and to fight corruption are at the center of discussions. The second trinational Summer University, organized in September 2014 by the universities of San Marcos and ESAN (the first graduate school of business in Latin America), was dedicated to the topic of "Economic and cultural foundations of the constitutional state". This Summer University is not limited to the university campus, but is open to civil society by including cultural institutions such as Goethe Institute and Alliance française in its program. Above all, this Summer University has a continuing education character because it specifically offers seminars for the officials of the Ministry of Justice and Human Rights.

Africa, Asia and Oceania
Since 2015/2016, the Franco-German studies at the University of Paris Nanterre under the direction of Professor Stephanie Dijoux, also set up trinational Summer and Winter Universities with higher education universities and research institutions in countries in the Eastern hemisphere.

Rankings 
In the QS, Paris-Nanterre University is ranked the 4th French higher-education institution in the field of arts and humanities, next to the Panthéon-Sorbonne University, Sorbonne University and the École normale supérieure de Paris, PSL University. The Times Higher Education World University Rankings considers Paris-Nanterre to be "one of the most prestigious universities in the country" and underlines the quality of its master's degree programs, its partnerships with the Grandes Ecoles, and its list of alumni.

In the Academic Ranking of World Universities (ARWU), also known as Shanghai Ranking, Paris-Nanterre University is ranked 50th in Archeology and 51st-100th in Anthropology.

Paris-Nanterre University's master's degree in Psychology is the first in France in terms of employability and professional integration, according to Parisien’s ranking in 2018.

The university offers very competitive programs with highly selective master's degrees in Law and Business. Because of the number of applications submitted each year, this University is one of the most desired French high-education institutions, ranked 3rd in France.

Notable people 
List includes notable people both alumni and faculty of the University. Alumni who also served as faculty are listed in bold font.

Alumni 
Jean-Jacques Aillagon, former French Minister of Culture
 Olivier Besancenot, former leader of the Ligue communiste révolutionnaire (LCR)
 Vincent Bolloré, current President & CEO of Bolloré
 Luc Brisson, philosopher
 Daniel Cohen, chaired professor at Paris School of Economics and contributor for Le Monde
 Daniel Cohn-Bendit known as "Dany le Rouge", leader of the May 68 student rebellion in France  and former Member of the European Parliament (MEP)
 Mama Kanny Diallo, current Guinean Minister of Planning and Economic Development
 Abdelaziz Djerrad, former Prime Minister of Algeria
 Mike Downey, co-founder & CEO of Film and Music Entertainment and current Chairman of European Film Academy
 Sylvie Germain, writer
 David Guetta, DJ, record producer, musician and songwriter
 María Ángela Holguín, former Colombian Minister of Foreign Affairs 
 Brice Hortefeux, current Member of the European Parliament (MEP), former French Minister of the Interior
 Christine Lagarde, current President of the European Central Bank, former Managing Director of the International Monetary Fund (IMF), former French Minister of Finance
 Ilaïsaane Lauouvéa, former Member of Congress of New Caledonia
 Cheng Li-chun, former Taiwanese Minister of Culture
 Leonardo López Luján, Mexican archaeologist and current Director of the Templo Mayor Project
 Emmanuel Macron, current President of France
 Jean-Luc Marion, philosopher
 Guillaume Martin, professional road cyclist
 Jeanne Mas, pop singer and actress
 Pierre Ménès, sports journalist
 Frederic Mitterrand, former French Minister of Culture
 Katalin Novák, current President of Hungary
 Dominique Ouattara, current First Lady of Ivory Coast
 Françoise de Panafieu, former Mayor of the 17th arrondissement of Paris
 Manuel Pinho, former Portuguese Minister of Economy
 Yasmina Reza, playwright, actress, novelist and screenwriter
 Mustapha Saha, sociologist, writer, painter, co-founder of the Mouvement du 22 Mars at the Faculty of Nanterre in 1968
 Nicolas Sarkozy, former President of France
 Dominique Strauss-Kahn, former Managing Director of the International Monetary Fund (IMF), former French Minister of Finance
 Dominique Tchimbakala, Congolese journalist, television presenter and news anchor for TV5Monde
Jany Temime, costume designer
 Dominique de Villepin, former Prime Minister of France

Faculty 
 Maurice Allais, Nobel Memorial Prize in Economics in 1988
 Jean-Jacques Becker, historian
 René Rémond, historian and political economist
 Denis Buican (1983–2003), historian of biology
 Jack Lang (1986–1988; 1993–1999), politician
 Michel Aglietta, economist and founder of the regulation school
 Michel Crozier, sociologist and member of the Académie des sciences morales et politiques
 Emmanuel Lévinas (1967), philosopher
 Jean Baudrillard, philosopher.
 Paul Ricœur (1966–1970), philosopher
 Étienne Balibar, philosopher
 Henri Lefebvre, geographer, professor, and influential figure in the events of 1968
 André Legrand, professor of French and comparative public law, Human Rights, Civil Liberties
 Claude Lepelley (1984–2002), historian
 Robert Merle, novelist
 Louise Merzeau, communication scholar
 Alain Pellet, expert on international law
 Catherine Perret philosopher
 Michèle Perret, linguistics professor and novelist
 Albert Piette, professor of anthropology 
 Yves Roucaute, philosopher, political scientist, Director of the "Cahiers de la Securite"
 Damianakos Stathis, Greek agriculturist and sociologist
 François Laruelle, philosopher
 Zoi Konstantopoulou, a Greek human rights lawyer and politician of the Coalition of the Radical Left (Syriza), also Speaker of the Hellenic Parliament
Géraud de Geouffre de La Pradelle, professor  of French law

Nanterre in fiction 
La Chinoise, by Jean-Luc Godard, 1967
My Sex Life...or How I Got Into an Argument, by Arnaud Desplechin, 1996
The Spanish Apartment, by Cédric Klapisch, 2002
District 13 (Banlieue 13), by Pierre Morel, 2004

See also 
 University of Paris
 Sorbonne
 Laboratoire d'ethnologie et de sociologie comparative

References

External links 
 Official website
 Official Sports Club Homepage

Educational institutions established in 1964
1964 establishments in France
Universities descended from the University of Paris
Paris Nanterre University